FSA Freedom were an American women's soccer team based in Sanford, Florida from 2005 to 2011. They were a member of the Women's Premier Soccer League, at the second level of the United States soccer pyramid, and played in the Sunshine Conference. They played their home games at David Maus Toyota Complex in Sanford, located 22 miles north of downtown Orlando.

The team was founded in 2005 as the Central Florida Strikers. In 2008 they became the Florida Surge, with the goal of offering a higher level of play for local and other soccer players. They adopted the name FSA Freedom in 2010. The club's colors were white and Carolina blue.

Players

Current roster

Notable former players

Year-by-year

Honors

Competition history

Coaches
Kim Montgomery -present
  Mauricio Ruiz

Stadia
 David Maus Toyota Complex, Sanford, Florida -present

Average attendance

References

External links
 Official Site
 WPSL Florida Surge page

Defunct soccer clubs in Florida
Women's Premier Soccer League teams
Women's soccer clubs in the United States
Soccer clubs in Orlando, Florida
Association football clubs established in 2005
2005 establishments in Florida
Association football clubs disestablished in 2011
2011 disestablishments in Florida